Song  is a tambon (subdistrict) located in the westernmost region of Nam Yuen district, in Ubon Ratchathani Province, Thailand. Song served as the district's capital until 1981, when its eastern region, where the district government office is located, became an independent tambon called Si Wichian. In 2021, it had a population of 8,419 people. Neighbouring subdistricts are (clockwise from the west) Khok Sa-at, Ta Kao, Kao Kham, Bu Pueai, and Si Wichian, as well as Choam Khsant District of Cambodia in the south.

History
Song is considered one of the oldest tambons of the Nam Yuen district, together with Yang and Dom Pradit, as well as Ta Kao, which was later split off to create Nam Khun district. During the reign of King Mongkut, the area was covered by Champasak's Ban Chanla Na Dom (บ้านจันลานาโดม); currently is Dom Pradit, a former district relegated to tambon in 1912. In 1969, Song became the seat of a newly established small district (king amphoe) affiliated with Det Udom, named "Nam Yuen," which was later promoted to an independent district in 1974. However, it lost the district's seat status when the eastern region, where the district government office is located, has become an autonomous division called tambon Si Wichian in 1981.

Tambon Song was once wholly governed by its subdistrict council until the establishment of the Sukhaphiban Nam Yuen area (สุขาภิบาลน้ำยืน) in 1973; since then, a populous area in the district's town center has been broken off and managed by a newly formed government. The subdistrict council was later upgraded to the Subdistrict Administrative Organization (SAO) in 1997, and, effectively on December 12, 2013, it was later promoted to a subdistrict municipality. Meanwhile, Sukhaphiban Nam Yuen, which covers some parts of both Song and Si Wichian due to the 1981 subdistrict separation, was promoted to a subdistrict municipality in 2005.

Geography
The tambon covers 157 km2 and is located in the western region of the Nam Yuen district. The north, which accounts for two-thirds of the total area and is home to the majority of the population, is an undulating plateau, while the rest is a rolling plain and highland of the Dângrêk Mountains, which form the border between Thailand and Cambodia.

Administration
The subdistrict of Song is divided into twelve villages (mubans; หมู่บ้าน). As of the 2021 census, it had a population of 8,419 people with 2,711 households.

Most of the area, more than 90 percent, is governed by the Song Subdistrict Municipality (เทศบาลตำบลโซง, Song Township), with only a small portion of the east region covered by another local government, the Nam Yuen Subdistrict Municipality (เทศบาลน้ำยืน, Nam Yuen Township), which also governs some of the neighboring subdistrict, Si Wichian.

The following is a list of the subdistrict's mubans, which roughly correspond to the villages.

References

Tambon of Ubon Ratchathani Province